Marouan Chouiref (born 27 May 1990) is a Tunisian handball player for Tremblay-en-France and the Tunisian national team.

At the 2012 and 2016 Summer Olympics he competed with the Tunisia national team in the men's tournament.

Honours

National team
Junior World Championship
 Bronze Medalist: 2011 Greece

Club
Arab Club Championship
 Winner: Berkane 2012
Tunisia National Cup
 Winner: 2011

References

External links

Living people
1990 births
Handball players at the 2012 Summer Olympics
Handball players at the 2016 Summer Olympics
Olympic handball players of Tunisia
Tunisian male handball players
Expatriate handball players in Turkey
Tunisian expatriate sportspeople in France
Tunisian expatriate sportspeople in Turkey
People from Mahdia
Mediterranean Games medalists in handball
Mediterranean Games silver medalists for Tunisia
Competitors at the 2013 Mediterranean Games
Competitors at the 2018 Mediterranean Games
Competitors at the 2022 Mediterranean Games